Gary Puccio is an American college baseball coach and former player. He was the head coach of the Fairleigh Dickinson Knights baseball team from 2011 to 2018.

Puccio earned his degree at C. W. Post, and later added a pair of master's degrees from Dowling College.  He served as a scout for the Seattle Mariners organization for many years, and as head coach at several levels of baseball.  He began at Division III SUNY Old Westbury for five seasons before moving to his first Division I job at Manhattan.  He helped develop a struggling program and registered 20 wins in 1998, the first time the Jaspers had accomplished that since 1903.  He then coached at Suffolk County Community College for four seasons.  He later led USCAA Briarcliffe to five straight national tournaments, including a pair of national championships, from 2006–2010.  He took over at Fairleigh Dickinson in the summer of 2010.  Prior to taking over the Knights, he also taught math at Island Trees High School in Levittown, New York, coaching baseball while not working at the college level.

Head coaching record
This table depicts Puccio's record as a head coach at the Division I level.

References

Living people
Briarcliffe Seahawks baseball coaches
Dowling College alumni
Fairleigh Dickinson Knights baseball coaches
High school baseball coaches in the United States
Long Island University alumni
Manhattan Jaspers baseball coaches
Old Westbury Panthers baseball coaches
Seattle Mariners scouts
Suffolk Sharks baseball coaches
Year of birth missing (living people)